Donald Terence Netter (1929–2018) was an American painter and former Jesuit priest.

References 

 
 
 
 
 

1929 births
2018 deaths
American painters